Sébastien Grosjean was the defending champion but did not compete that year.

Thomas Johansson won in the final 7–5, 6–3 against Harel Levy.

Seeds

  Jan-Michael Gambill (first round)
  Wayne Ferreira (quarterfinals)
  Thomas Johansson (champion)
  David Prinosil (first round)
  Fabrice Santoro (withdrew)
  Alberto Martín (first round)
  Harel Levy (final)
  Jonas Björkman (second round)

Draw

Finals

Top half

Bottom half

External links
 2001 Nottingham Open Singles draw

Nottingham Open
2001 ATP Tour